Tarawera Falls is a 65 m high waterfall on the Tarawera River in the Bay of Plenty region in New Zealand's North Island.

The Tarawera River flows out of Lake Tarawera and across a rhyolitic lava flow that erupted from Mt Tarawera about 11,000 years ago. The river disappears about 30 metres back from the clifftop into flooded caves in the lava and pours out halfway up the cliff on the far side of the flow.

After rain, part of the flow passes over the top of the cliff as a 65 m tall companion fall.

Access is from the town of Kawerau and is a drive of about 45 minutes over unsealed roads, followed by a walk of about 20 minutes.  A forestry access permit is required, available from the Information Centre in Kawerau.

Māori history
The Te Arawa and Ngāti Awa tribes have traditional associations with this site. Ngāti Rangitihi, one of the eight Te Arawa tribal groups, are the current guardians of the area and consider the site of the waterfall a sacred place.

Fauna and flora
The vegetation in the area has only developed since the 1886 Tarawera eruption and contains an unusual range of hybrids between pohutukawa and rata. Migrating eels swim as far up as the waterfall and can sometimes be seen on the weastern side of the falls searching for a way further upstream.

References

Rotorua Lakes District
Landforms of the Bay of Plenty Region
Waterfalls of New Zealand